Arkansas Highway 287 (AR 287 and Hwy. 287) is a designation for two state highways in Conway County. One segment of  runs east–west from Arkansas Highway 9 near Morrilton east to Arkansas Highway 92. A second segment of  runs north–south connecting Highway 9 to Arkansas Highway 95.

Route description

Morrilton to Highway 92
AR 287 begins at AR 9 just north of Morrilton and an interchange with Interstate 40. The route runs past the Oak Grove Cemetery before terminating at AR 92 north of Plumerville. A second segment of  runs north–south connecting Highway 9 to Arkansas Highway 95. The road is two–lane undivided for its entire length.

Solgohachia to Highway 95
The highway begins at the unincorporated community of Solgohachia at Highway 9. AR 287 heads north through the communities of McClaren and Lanty before it terminates at AR 95. The road is two–lane undivided for its entire length.

Major intersections

|-
| colspan=5 align=center| AR 287 northern segment begins at AR 9
|-

See also
 Solgohachia Bridge, bridge listed on the National Register of Historic Places near Solgohachia

References

287
Transportation in Conway County, Arkansas